Lutz Löscher (born 9 January 1960) is a German former swimmer. He competed in two events at the 1976 Summer Olympics.

References

1960 births
Living people
German male swimmers
Olympic swimmers of East Germany
Swimmers at the 1976 Summer Olympics
Swimmers from Leipzig